Bella Agossou (Arabic: بيلا أجوسو; born 1981) is a Beninese actress in Spanish cinema.

Career
Agossou began her career in Benin as a theater actress with the company "Sonangnon" created and developed by her. However, after 4 years of creating the company, she moved to Spain in 2002. Then she learned Catalan and Spanish languages to pursue a career as an actress. She acted in the film Un cuento de Navidad (Christmas Tale) with the leading role of a woman wanted by the police for lack of papers as an illegal immigrant.

Later, she played critically acclaimed roles in several African and international films including Los Nuestros, Moranetta, A cuento of Nadal and Palmeras en la Nieve. On 13 July 2017, Agossou presented to the press a shop called "NOK".

Filmography

References

External links
 
 Quand Bella Agossou révèle le Bénin Outre-mer

Living people
1981 births
Spanish film actresses
Beninese film actresses
People from Collines Department
Beninese emigrants to Spain
Naturalised citizens of Spain
Spanish television actresses
Spanish people of Beninese descent